Hypoactivity is an inhibition of behavioral or locomotor activity.

Hypoactivity is a characteristic effect of sedative agents and many centrally acting anesthetics. Other drugs such as antipsychotics and mCPP also produce this effect, often as a side effect.

It may be a characteristic symptom of the inattentive type of ADHD (ADHD-PI) and sluggish cognitive tempo.

Also see
 Hyperactivity

References

Symptoms and signs of mental disorders